DXFE (1197 AM) is a non-commercial broadcast radio station owned and operated by the Far East Broadcasting Company in the Philippines. The station's studio is located along Circumferential Rd., Doña Vicenta Village, Davao City, and the transmitter is located along Duha corner San Rafael Rd., Brgy. 10-A, Davao City.

It operates Mondays to Fridays from 5:00 AM to 9:00 PM, Saturdays from 5:00 AM to 7:00 PM and Sundays from 5:00 AM to 5:00 PM.

References

Radio stations in Davao City
Christian radio stations in the Philippines
News and talk radio stations in the Philippines
Radio stations established in 1972
1972 establishments in the Philippines
Far East Broadcasting Company